The 1812 Massachusetts gubernatorial election was held on April 6, 1812.

Incumbent Democratic-Republican Governor Elbridge Gerry was defeated by Federalist nominee Caleb Strong.

General election

Candidates
Elbridge Gerry, Democratic-Republican, incumbent Governor
Caleb Strong, Federalist, former Governor

Results

References

1812
Massachusetts
Gubernatorial